Your Pretty Face Is Going to Hell is an American live-action television series on Adult Swim, Cartoon Network's late night programming block. The series made its official debut on April 18, 2013, on Adult Swim. The show is a live-action workplace comedy about Gary, an associate demon, as he attempts to capture souls on earth in order to climb the corporate ladder of the underworld. Gary hopes to advance in Hell, but he may be too stupid, lazy and kind-hearted to realize his dreams of promotion.

The show was renewed for a fourth season, which began production on June 5, 2017. The fourth season premiered on May 3, 2019.

On July 13, 2020, co-creator Dave Willis announced that a one-off extended finale special was in the works, with the possibility of internet-exclusive shorts in the future. The extended finale was eventually scrapped, but the internet-exclusive shorts, known as Your Pretty Face Is Going to Hell: The Cartoon (originally announced as Your Pretty Face Is Going to Hell: The Animated Series), was released on October 21, 2022 on the Adult Swim YouTube channel.

The show is titled after a song from the 1973 album Raw Power by the Stooges.

Characters
 Gary Bunda (Henry Zebrowski) – a bumbling employee in Hell whose schemes to condemn human souls to Hell often fail. 
 Claude Vernon (Craig Rowin, Season 1 & 2, Season 3 (second half), and season 4) – Gary's younger and more-respected intern who often shows him up at work. The character wasn't present for the 1st half of season 3, though no mention is made of what became of him. He returned in the 2nd half of season 3, starting with the episode "Golden Fiddle Week".
 "Satan", a.k.a. *Darren Farley (Matt Servitto) – Gary's boss, who presents himself as THE Satan who rules all of Hell in seasons 1 & 2. But season 3 revealed that he's actually Darren Farley, a demon who rose up the ranks to middle management and runs the 11th circle of Hell, for "Miscellaneous" sins. 
 Lucas (Dana Snyder, Seasons 1 & 2) – Gary's former roommate who's still alive. He appears annoyed when Gary returns to Earth to recruit him.
 Benji (Dan Triandiflou) – one of Gary's co-workers in Hell. He's usually in charge of making the orientation and 'how to' videos of Hell. Formerly a TV weatherman in Charlotte, he was arrested by the FBI for raping, murdering, and cannibalizing 143 children.
 Troy Ersatz (Dana Snyder, Season 3 & 4) – Gary's co-worker in Hell who replaced Claude for most of season 3, is different from Snyder's other character Lucas. Unlike Claude, Troy tends to end up suffering alongside Gary when their various schemes backfire and was once temporarily demoted to "tortured soul" status.
 Eddie (Eddie Pepitone) – a tortured soul. He's often seen as the victim of various acts of sadism brought on by the demons or Satan himself. He gets briefly promoted to demon status when Troy is demoted, in season 3, but Eddie was traumatized by the horrors inflicted upon him by the other demons and having a heart of gold, he failed to live up to the job. He still won out over Troy and earned his place as a real demon, but was demoted following a behind the scenes "real life" scene depicting Eddie Pepitone's refusal to go through the make-up procedures.
 Demon William (William Tokarsky), William is the very 1st demon that we see and he comes back in 15 of the episodes in all 4 seasons.

Episodes

Original pilot (2011)

Season 1 (2013)

Season 2 (2015)

Season 3 (2016–17)
With season three, the character "Claude" was written out of the series as actor Craig Rowin left the series. Dana Snyder, who played Gary's best friend Lucas in seasons 1–2, was made series regular to replace Rowin. However, rather than continuing in the role of Lucas, Snyder was cast in a new role as "Troy", a new demon coworker for Gary.

Season 4 (2019)

References

External links 
 
 
 Official Twitter

Adult Swim original programming
2010s American horror comedy television series
2010s American surreal comedy television series
2010s American workplace comedy television series
2013 American television series debuts
2019 American television series endings
Demons in television
Fiction about the Devil
English-language television shows
Hell in popular culture
Television series by Williams Street
Television series created by Dave Willis
Television series created by Casper Kelly